Otto Brauneck (27 February 1896 – 26 July 1917) was a German World War I flying ace credited with ten confirmed and five unconfirmed aerial victories. Originally assigned to fly on the Macedonian Front to support Germany's ally, the Ottoman Empire, between September 1916 and April 1917 Brauneck shot down four enemy observation balloons and three aircraft, with a further five claims going unproven. Transferred to the Red Baron's Jagdstaffel 11 in France, Brauneck scored a further three victories before being killed in action on 26 July 1917.

Early life

Otto Brauneck was born on 27 February 1896 in Sulzbach, the German Empire.

Aerial service

In Macedonia

Brauneck joined the air service and was posted to FFA 69 in Macedonia. He scored first in September 1916. His second victory, over an observation balloon on 14 December, earned him the Iron Cross First Class. After an unconfirmed victory on Christmas Day, he shot down two balloons on 5 January 1917. He then transferred to Jagdstaffel 25 on 14 January 1917. On 19 January, he received the Knight's Cross of the Royal House Order of Hohenzollern. Between 19 January and 6 April 1917, he claimed seven triumphs, only three of which were confirmed.

Victories in Macedonia
"U/C" marks an unconfirmed victory.

In France

On 20 April 1917, he moved to Jasta 11 on the Western Front, to serve under Manfred von Richthofen. He scored twice in early June. On 22 July 1917, he shot down a 10 Naval Squadron Sopwith Triplane, probably Canadian seven-victory ace Flight Lieutenant John Albert Page. On 26 July 1917, Brauneck fell to the guns of 70 Squadron's Captain Noel Webb.

Victories in France

Decorations and awards
 Knight's Cross of the Royal House Order of Hohenzollern (19 January 1917)
 Iron Cross of 1914, 1st and 2nd class

Sources of information

References
 Above the Lines: The Aces and Fighter Units of the German Air Service, Naval Air Service and Flanders Marine Corps 1914 - 1918 Norman L. R. Franks, et al. Grub Street, 1993. , .

1896 births
1917 deaths
Aviators killed by being shot down
German military personnel killed in World War I
German World War I flying aces
Luftstreitkräfte personnel
People from the Rhine Province
People from Saarbrücken (district)
Military personnel from Saarland